A church fan is a term used mainly in the United States for a hand fan used within a Christian church building to cool oneself off. The fan typically has a wooden handle and a fan blade made of hard stock paper (i.e. card-stock, 2-ply), often with a staple adjoining the two materials.

History 
Modern air-conditioning became widely available in America during the 1950s. However, many churches (primarily African-American congregations) were unable to afford the cooling machines for their church buildings. In addition to their function of cooling the body, the paper blade of the fans were used for printed illustrations and community advertisements. Historically, funeral homes often acquired the space on the back of the fans to advertise their services to the churches members, in addition to other local businesses and services. Illustrations on the front blade of the fans are varied in subject matter, from illustrations of Jesus Christ to notable people within the respective churches’ communities.

Contemporary use 
With the spread of modern air-conditioning units within church buildings, church fans have become less popular. However, many churches still supply hand fans for their members.

References 

Ventilation fans
Christian art